The Society of St. Peter the Apostle (SPA) is one of the four Pontifical Mission Societies. It is the Catholic Church’s official fundraising body for the training of clergy and religious in mission countries. 

It was founded in 1889 by Stephanie Bigard and her daughter and Jeanne, of Caen, France, at the request of Jules-Alphonse Cousin, then bishop of Nagasaki. Bishop Cousin asked for financial assistance to keep his seminary open. In 1922, the Society obtained papal patronage from Pope Pius XI. Its focus is primarily in  mostly in Africa and Asia. 

Today the SPA is established in 157 countries. It supports 1,069 mission dioceses and funds the training of 31,000 seminarians in about 500 seminaries and 10,000 novices.

References

External links
The Society of St Peter the Apostle

Catholic Church organizations